Emmelichthys is a genus of fish in the family Emmelichthyidae, the rovers.

Species
There are seven species in the genus, including one newly described in 2014:
 Emmelichthys elongatus Kotlyar, 1982
 Emmelichthys karnellai Heemstra & J. E. Randall, 1977 – Karnella's rover
 Emmelichthys marisrubri R. Fricke, Golani & Appelbaum-Golani, 2014
 Emmelichthys nitidus J. Richardson, 1845
 Emmelichthys nitidus cyanescens Guichenot, 1848
 Emmelichthys nitidus nitidus J. Richardson, 1845 – Cape bonnetmouth
 Emmelichthys ruber Trunov, 1976 – red rover
 Emmelichthys struhsakeri Heemstra & J. E. Randall, 1977 – golden redbait

Timeline

References

Emmelichthyidae
Taxa named by John Richardson (naturalist)